Ameristar Casino Hotel Kansas City (formerly Station Casino Kansas City) is a hotel and casino located on the Missouri River in Kansas City, Missouri. It is owned by Gaming and Leisure Properties and operated by Boyd Gaming.

The  casino has 2,800 slot and video poker machines, 57 table games, a live poker room with 15 poker tables, exclusive high-limit slot and table games areas, and a 184-room hotel that includes 36 mini and 12 king suites.

History
The facility opened on January 16, 1997 as Station Casino. Ameristar Casinos acquired the property on December 19, 2000 and it was rebranded to its current name.

In August 2013, the property became part of Pinnacle Entertainment when that company acquired Ameristar Casinos. In April 2016, the property was sold to Gaming and Leisure Properties along with almost all of Pinnacle's real estate assets, and leased back to Pinnacle.

In October 2018, Pinnacle sold the casino's operating business to Boyd Gaming, along with three other casinos, in connection with Pinnacle's acquisition by Penn National Gaming. The sale was required by antitrust regulators because Penn National already operated two casinos in the Kansas City area. The sale included a perpetual license to use the Ameristar name.

References

External links
 

1997 establishments in Missouri
1997 ships
Ameristar casinos
Boyd Gaming
Buildings and structures completed in 1997
Buildings and structures in Kansas City, Missouri
Casino hotels
Casinos completed in 1997
Casinos in Missouri
Hotel buildings completed in 1997
Hotels established in 1997
Hotels in Kansas City, Missouri
Riverboat casinos
Tourist attractions in Kansas City, Missouri